Sorkh Kola or Sorkh Kala may refer to:
 Sorkh Kola, Amol
 Sorkh Kola, Sari